John Guthrie is a British political activist formerly involved in the youth section of the Conservative Party and a former employee of Conservative Central Office. He has been active in Bedford politics and run for mayoral office.

Young Conservatives

Guthrie joined Luton Young Conservatives in the early eighties and rose to be National vice-chairman (1982/4).  He worked closely with National chairman Phil Pedley to counter extremism and spoke against Harvey Proctor MP in the balloted motion on Immigration at the 1983 Party Conference. He co-ordinated the Young Conservative/BBC poll of delegates that showed most attendees did not support the extreme views promoted at the conference by the Monday Club.

He became National Chairman of the Young Conservatives in 1984 as the moderate (wets) candidate. The Guardian reported: "Mr Guthrie represents the dominant wet wing of the YC's was elected as national chairman in a ballot last week by a convincing majority of 222 to 81 over his right-wing rival, Mr Colin Jackson."

YC Report into Right Wing Infiltration & Extremism

As a member of the Young Conservatives Committee on Extremist Infiltration, in 1983/84 he continued to support the Final Report and the Panorama programme after Pedley's Chairmanship term ended. Despite pressure from the Party chairman, John Selwyn Gummer, Guthrie remained steadfast . The Times reported: "… in an astonishing intervention which would have been wholly unwelcome to the party chairman," he referred to "the strange antics," of Conservative Central Office in "orchestrating" an attack against the Panorama programme. Guthrie warned Gummer, the Party was fostering the impression that it would not act on extremist infiltration. "It is therefore disturbing to see that some have seen fit to undermine our work in this area by challenging the basis of this programme." Guthrie warned the Party chairman, that the Young Conservatives would continue to speak out on the issue of extremists."We are not prepared to see the strange antics of Central Office deflect us from our commitment to the Report or its recommendations. If it transpires that we are the only section of the Party that is prepared to place principle over convenience in this respect, then we are fully prepared to accept that role."

The Party acted on Guthrie's call to comb the Party for extremists. Sir Russell Sanderson, Chairman of the voluntary party announced steps to tighten selection procedures at al levels. And in March the Party vice-chairman in charge of Candidates, David Hunt MP, announced plans to comb the files for extremists. The YC's remained unhappy two key recommendations were not adopted: the creation of a permanent monitoring unit and the countering of extreme groups on the fringe of the party.

Guthrie was succeeded by fellow moderate, Richard Fuller as National Chairman of the Young Conservatives in February 1985.

Tory Reform Group

In 1988 Guthrie became National Chairman of the One Nation leaning Tory Reform Group, overseeing a revamp of the organisation and finishing his term in 1991.

Parliamentary and European Elections

The 1992 General election saw him standing as the Conservative candidate against Greville Janner (Labour )in Leicester West. From 1992 -94, he directed the Conservative Party's International Office at Conservative Central Office and ran the party's 1994 European Elections Campaign.

Local activism

In 2010, Guthrie won the ballot to run as the Conservative Candidate in the 2011 Bedford Mayoral elections. In the campaign for Bedford Mayor, he finished a close second to the Liberal Democrat candidate in the second ballot.

References

Living people
Year of birth missing (living people)
Conservative Party (UK) parliamentary candidates